Scott Cupps is an American politician serving as a member of the Missouri House of Representatives from the 158th district. Elected in November 2019, he assumed office on January 5, 2020.

Personal life 
Cupps in a native of Shell Knob, Missouri. Prior to entering politics, Cupps owned an operated a farm. Cupps was elected to the Missouri House of Representatives in a 2019 special election after Scott Fitzpatrick resigned from office to serve as the 47th treasurer of Missouri.

References 

Living people
Year of birth missing (living people)
People from Shell Knob, Missouri
Republican Party members of the Missouri House of Representatives